Gunstone is a hamlet in the South Staffordshire district of Staffordshire, England. It is situated north east of the village of Codsall.

Place name and location 
The place-name 'Gunstone' was first recorded in 1186 as Gonestona. Toponymists have the name coming from a combination of an Old Norse personal name - Gunni or Gunnr, with Old English tūn, giving the enclosure or farmstead of Gunni. In early English times, Gunstone sat just a few miles south of border of the Danelaw at Watling Street - the area of England under Danish control.

The settlement is based around Whitehouse Lane, with Pendeford in Wolverhampton to the east and Codsall Wood to the west. The Moat Brook, a tributary of the River Penk, passes through Gunstone, occasionally flooding sections of Whitehouse Lane after a period of sustained rain.

A Roman road ran south through this area from Pennocrucium in the direction of Greensforge.

Today 
 Gunstone hasn't changed much in the 20th century and is still very much a rural hamlet flanked by fields and farms despite its proximity to nearby Wolverhampton (2 miles from the city's north western border).
Gunstone Hall Equestrian is a livery yard, is based here, ran by husband and wife team, Samantha and William Fish.

Alongside the Staffordshire Way route - a bridleway that passes through the area, is Gunstone Farm. In July 2010 the farm listed traditional farm buildings for sale through Smiths Gore, with full planning consent for conversion to residential dwellings.

Further reading 
 Gunstone Hall Equestrian Facebook page

References 

South Staffordshire District
Hamlets in Staffordshire